The Kerinci Expedition was a punitive expedition of the Royal Netherlands East Indies Army to Kerinci (then Korintji), on the west coast of Sumatra, from 12 May to 4 September 1903.

Sources
1906. De expeditie naar Korintji in 1903. uittreksels uit de verslagen der verschillende wapens en diensten met daarnaast enige afzonderlijke bijlagen. Indisch Militair Tijdschrift. Extra Bijlage nummer 17. G. Kolff & Co. Batavia.

History of Sumatra
Conflicts in 1903
1903 in the Dutch East Indies
Punitive expeditions of the Netherlands
Dutch conquest of Indonesia